Nephrotoma scurra is a species of crane fly found in most of Europe and the East Palearctic. It should not to be confused with the crane fly Pselliophora scurra Alexander, 1941, from the subfamily Ctenophorinae.

References

Tipulidae
Diptera of Europe
Diptera of Asia
Insects described in 1818